In enzymology, an arogenate dehydrogenase is an enzyme that catalyzes the chemical reaction

L-arogenate + NAD+  L-tyrosine + NADH + CO2

Thus, the two substrates of this enzyme are L-arogenate and NAD+, whereas its 3 products are L-tyrosine, NADH, and CO2.

This enzyme belongs to the family of oxidoreductases, specifically those acting on the CH-CH group of donor with NAD+ or NADP+ as acceptor.  The systematic name of this enzyme class is L-arogenate:NAD+ oxidoreductase (decarboxylating). Other names in common use include arogenic dehydrogenase (ambiguous), cyclohexadienyl dehydrogenase, pretyrosine dehydrogenase (ambiguous), and L-arogenate:NAD+ oxidoreductase.  This enzyme participates in phenylalanine, tyrosine and tryptophan biosynthesis and novobiocin biosynthesis.

Structural studies

As of late 2007, only one structure has been solved for this class of enzymes, with the PDB accession code .

References

 
 
 
 
 

EC 1.3.1
NADH-dependent enzymes
Enzymes of known structure